Coronado Elementary School is a historic elementary school in the Barelas neighborhood of Albuquerque, New Mexico. Built in 1936–37 as a Public Works Administration project, it is the city's third-oldest operating elementary school. Coronado School was added to the New Mexico State Register of Cultural Properties  and the National Register of Historic Places in 1996. It is a part of Albuquerque Public Schools.

History
The school was built by the PWA at a cost of $125,000 and opened in 1937. It was designed by Louis G. Hesselden, who was the architect for Albuquerque Public Schools at the time.  Coronado operated as an elementary school until 1975, when it was converted to administrative use.

In 2006, with Downtown Albuquerque experiencing a resurgence and existing inner-city schools becoming crowded, APS began exploring the possibility of reopening Coronado. After securing funding for this purpose, the district embarked on an $8.3 million project to return the school to service. This included restoring the main building to its original appearance and making it ADA-compliant, as well as adding a new gym, cafeteria, library, media center, and playground. Coronado Elementary officially reopened for the 2009–10 school year on August 24, 2009.

References

External links
Coronado Elementary School
Coronado Elementary School (archive)

School buildings on the National Register of Historic Places in New Mexico
Schools in Albuquerque, New Mexico
Public elementary schools in New Mexico
School buildings completed in 1937
New Mexico State Register of Cultural Properties
National Register of Historic Places in Albuquerque, New Mexico
1937 establishments in New Mexico